Shirley Airport was an airfield operational in the mid-20th century in Shirley, Massachusetts. It is now the site for a 6 MW solar farm supplying electricity to the town of Billerica, MA.

References

Defunct airports in Massachusetts
Airports in Worcester County, Massachusetts
Shirley, Massachusetts